The SHE 36 is a British sailboat that was designed by Sparkman & Stephens as an International Offshore Rule Three-Quarter Ton class racer-cruiser and first built in 1977.

The SHE 36 is a development of Sparkman & Stephens' design 2166, with the rudder moved aft, giving a longer waterline, a deep keel and other changes. The basic Sparkman & Stephens' design 2166 is also used by the Aura A35, Hughes 35 and the North Star 1500.

Production
The design was built by South Hants Engineering in the United Kingdom, starting in 1977, but it is now out of production.

Design
The SHE 36 is a recreational keelboat, built predominantly of glassfibre, with wood trim. It has a masthead sloop rig, a raked stem, a reverse transom, a skeg-mounted rudder controlled by a wheel and a fixed swept fin keel. It displaces  and carries  of lead ballast.

The design has sleeping accommodation for six people, with a double "V"-berth in the bow cabin, two straight settees and a pilot berth in the main cabin and an aft cabin with a single berth on the port side. The galley is located on the starboard side at the companionway ladder. The galley is equipped with a two-burner stove and a sink. A navigation station is opposite the galley, on the port side. The head is located just aft of the bow cabin on the port side.

Operational history
The boat was supported by an active class club, the IOR 3/4 Ton Class, which organized racing events until its demise in 1994.

See also
List of sailing boat types

Related development
 Aura A35
 Hughes 35
 North Star 1500

References

Keelboats
1970s sailboat type designs
Sailing yachts
Sailboat type designs by Sparkman and Stephens
Sailboat types built by South Hants Engineering